Tom Beaulieu is a Canadian politician, who was a member of the Legislative Assembly of the Northwest Territories from 2007 to 2019.

Beaulieu began his political career serving on the Fort Resolution town council. He later became a deputy minister in the Northwest Territories government.
 
Beaulieu was first elected to the territorial legislature in the 2007 Northwest Territories general election. He won the Tu Nedhe electoral district defeating incumbent Bobby J. Villeneuve with nearly 53% of the popular vote.

In 2015, he won reelection to the legislature in the new district of Tu Nedhé-Wiilideh. He retired from politics in 2019, and did not run for another term in the 2019 election.

References

External links
Tom Beaulieu Legislature biography

Members of the Legislative Assembly of the Northwest Territories
Living people
Franco-Ténois people
Members of the Executive Council of the Northwest Territories
1958 births
Northwest Territories municipal councillors
21st-century Canadian politicians